Aquis orbicularis is a moth of the family Nolidae first described by Francis Walker in 1858. It is found in the Indian subregion, Sri Lanka, Peninsular Malaysia, Papua New Guinea and Borneo.

Description
Forewings brownish with falcate apex. There is a curved transverse fascia found in the medial area. Several black dots found on forewings, but absent in hindwings. Male genitalia with triangular uncus and broad valves.

References

Moths of Asia
Moths described in 1858
Nolidae